The 1928 United States presidential election in New Mexico took place on November 6, 1928. All contemporary forty-eight states were part of the 1928 United States presidential election. State voters chose three electors to represent them in the Electoral College, who voted for president and vice president.

Background
New Mexico had in its early history as a state shown itself, like all of the West at the time, to be very much a swing state, having backed Woodrow Wilson twice in 1912 and 1916 and then backed Warren G. Harding and Calvin Coolidge in their landslide 1920 and 1924 victories. During this era – and indeed since the 1870s – New Mexico was divided between largely Republican machine-run highland regions and its firmly Southern Democrat Baptist "Little Texas" region in its east.

However, the nomination of Catholic Al Smith on the first ballot after almost all other Democrats sat the election out challenged the status quo. Fear ensued in the South, which had no experience of the Southern and Eastern European Catholic immigrants who were Smith's local constituency. Southern fundamentalist Protestants believed that Smith would allow papal and priestly leadership in the United States, which Protestantism was a reaction against. At the same time, there existed potential for a pro-Catholic swing in the traditional GOP Spanish-American mountain counties of the North.

Polls in July regarded New Mexico as "doubtful", although these had taken little account of the religious issues that were to dominate the election.

Vote
New Mexico was won by Secretary of Commerce Herbert Hoover over New York Governor Al Smith in a 18-point landslide. In traditionally fiercely Democratic "Little Texas", anti-Catholic prejudice was identical to that which turned Texas and Oklahoma to Hoover and Smith retained just one of the eleven counties that had voted for John W. Davis in 1924. In the mountain counties of traditional Republican strength, by contrast, Hoover losses proved minor, as the Catholic Hispanic areas could not identify with the urban New Yorker Smith.

At this time the Republican Party was widely associated in the minds of many Americans with the economic success of the mid-1920s, although the post-Civil War Democratic stronghold in the Deep South was still evident by the time of this election.

Results

Results by county

References

New Mexico
1928 New Mexico elections
1928